Scutelliseta is a genus of flies belonging to the family Sphaeroceridae, the lesser dung flies.

Species
S. albicoxa Richards, 1968
S. bicolorina Richards, 1968
S. brunneonigra Richards, 1968
S. caledoniana Richards, 1968
S. coriacea Richards, 1960
S. leonina Richards, 1968
S. lepidogaster Richards, 1968
S. luteifrons Richards, 1968
S. megalogaster Richards, 1968
S. mesaptiloides Richards, 1968
S. microptera Richards, 1968
S. mischogaster Norrbom & Kim, 1985
S. nigrocaerulea Richards, 1968
S. orbitalis Richards, 1968
S. peregrina Richards, 1968
S. procoxalis Richards, 1968
S. swaziana Richards, 1968
S. xanthothorax Richards, 1968

References

 
Sphaeroceroidea genera
Diptera of Africa